Les gazelles (English title: Gazelles) is a 2014 French comedy film directed by Mona Achache.

Plot
Marie and Eric, a couple in their thirties who have been together since college, buy their first apartment when Marie is suddenly overcome by doubt. Her encounter with a handsome, dark-haired man forces her to make a decision: she leaves Eric to throw herself into the big sea of pleasure and freedom. But she actually ends up on the bottom of the pool, where she discovers a world without pity: at her age, being single is quickly perceived as a suspicious defect. Enlightened by new friendships, Marie learns to envisage her single life as a chance to become even stronger and to at last be ready to be happy.

Cast

 Camille Chamoux as Marie
 Audrey Fleurot as Sandra
 Joséphine de Meaux as Judith
 Naidra Ayadi as Myriam
 Anne Brochet as Gwen
 Olivia Côte as Véro
 Franck Gastambide as Eric
 Samuel Benchetrit as Martin
 Camille Cottin as Emilie
 Josiane Balasko as Brigitte
 Sam Karmann as Jacques
 Rachel Arditi as Virginie
 Grégoire Ludig as Marco
 David Marsais as Olivier
 Stéphane De Groodt as M. Hublot
 Lolita Chammah as Marie 2
 Maciej Patronik as Janusz
 Miljan Chatelain as Solal
 Marie Dompnier as Charlotte Poussin
 Bastien Ehouzan as Alex
 Jean-Baptiste Puech as Oscar
 Mathieu Madénian as the man who wants a job

References

External links

2014 comedy films
French comedy films
2010s French films
Films directed by Mona Achache
Films with screenplays by Mona Achache